Sant'Angelo Minore is a Roman Catholic, Franciscan church in Cagli, province of Pesaro e Urbino, region of Marche, Italy.

History

The church was erected in 1362 by the Confraternity of Sant'Angelo, and the Façade has a loggia attributed to the architect Francesco di Giorgio Martini. The interior has an altarpiece depicting Noli me tangere by Timoteo Viti.

References

Roman Catholic churches in Cagli
14th-century Roman Catholic church buildings in Italy
Churches completed in 1362